Beaver Creek is a stream in the U.S. state of Wisconsin. It is a tributary to the Yellow River.

Beaver Creek was so named for the beavers along its course.

References

Rivers of Wood County, Wisconsin
Rivers of Wisconsin